Harry Lindsay Eden (23 May 1943 – 14 December 2006) was a rugby league footballer who played with three Sydney clubs during his career – Eastern Suburbs, St George and South Sydney Rabbitohs.  He was born in Sydney and played junior rugby league for Ramsgate United in the St George Junior league.

Career

He played three seasons with the Dragons between 1971–1973 and was a member of St George first grade team that was defeated by South Sydney in the 1971 Grand Final.

He was a member of the St. George Third Grade side that won the premiership in 1972. Harry Eden played his last two seasons with South Sydney Rabbitohs in 1974 and 1975. He was the uncle of Rothmans Medal winner Michael Eden.

Harry Eden still holds the record for the most tries in a season by a prop forward, set while playing for South Sydney Rabbitohs during the 1975 season.

Death

Harry Eden died of cancer in 2006 aged 63.

References

Sources
 The Encyclopedia Of Rugby League Players; Alan Whiticker & Glen Hudson

1943 births
Australian rugby league players
Sydney Roosters players
St. George Dragons players
South Sydney Rabbitohs players
2006 deaths
Deaths from cancer in New South Wales
Rugby league props
Rugby league players from Sydney